The women's shot put at the 2009 World Championships in Athletics was held at the Olympic Stadium on August 16. Having set a world-leading and Oceanian record of 20.69 m in May, Valerie Vili was a strong favourite and defending champion. The seven best marks of the season all belonged to Vili, and only Anna Avdeyeva and Natallia Mikhnevich had thrown further than twenty metres that season. Former world champion Nadezhda Ostapchuk, Olympic medallist Nadine Kleinert and Gong Lijiao were other athletes who had a chance of reaching the podium.

Home competitor Kleinert took an early lead with a new personal best of 20.06 m. In the second round, Gong moved up into second place with 19.89 m, a personal best that eventually won her the bronze medal. Vili responded with 20.25 m in the third round, and Kleinert also improved to 20.20 m. Vili proved superior, however, throwing over twenty metres three more times and finishing with a best of 20.44 m. This gave Vili her second World Championships gold medal. Avdeyeva and Mikhnevich rounded out the top five, both with 19.66 m marks.

Medalists

Records

Qualification standards

Schedule

Results

Qualification
Qualification: Qualifying Performance 18.50 (Q) or at least 12 best performers (q) advance to the final.

Key:  PB = Personal best, Q = qualification by place in heat, q = qualification by overall place

Final

Key:  PB = Personal best

See also
 2009 Shot Put Year Ranking

References
General
Shot put results (Archived 2009-09-08). IAAF. Retrieved on 2009-08-16.

Specific

Shot put
Shot put at the World Athletics Championships
2009 in women's athletics